The Icon class (formally Project Icon) is a planned class of cruise ships ordered by Royal Caribbean International and to be built by Meyer Turku in Turku, Finland. Royal Caribbean plans to have 3 Icon-class ships by 2030.

History 
On 10 October 2016, Royal Caribbean and Meyer Turku announced an order to build two ships under the project name "Icon". The first two ships are planned to be delivered in the second quarters of 2022 and 2024. The ships will be classified by DNV GL.

Royal Caribbean applied to register a trademark for "Icon of the Seas" in 2016, which was at the time suggested as an indication of the name of the first ship.

On 2 July 2019, Royal Caribbean announced an order for a third ship in the "Icon" class. The third ship is planned to be delivered in 2025, one year after the second "Icon" ship.

Steel-cutting for Icon of the Seas began on 14 June 2021, and the keel was laid on 5 April 2022.

Steel-cutting for the second "Icon" class ship began on 15 February 2023.

Design 
The ships will employ fuel cell technology, to be supplied by ABB Group, and be powered by liquefied natural gas, with a gross tonnage of 200,000 GT. Ships will contain other alternative energy features, like the use of fuel cells to produce electricity and fresh water. It will have a capacity of 5,600 berths.

Later, in May 2022, Royal Caribbean confirmed that Icon of the Seas would be bigger than the Oasis class.

Ships

References

Cruise ship classes
Proposed ships
Royal Caribbean International